Division Street is a street and shopping area located in the Devonshire Quarter of Sheffield, England. It is home to many small independent shops, a few large ones such as Costa Coffee and Sainsburys Local, and a few local pubs such as the Frog & Parrot, as well as a Lloyd's No. 1 bar. It runs parallel to West Street in the west of the city.

The post-box at the end of Division Street near the City Hall was painted gold in August 2012, to celebrate the Olympic gold medal won by Sheffield's Jessica Ennis.

References

Sheffield City Centre
Streets in Sheffield